Kimberly Anne McCullough (born March 5, 1978) is an American actress and television director. She is best known for her role as Robin Scorpio on the soap opera General Hospital, a role which she originated at age seven, playing the character on and off from 1985 to 2001 with a stint in 2004. McCullough later returned to the show in 2005 as a doctor and departed in 2012. She has made sporadic guest appearances since July 2012. She returned to the show in August 2013, but went off-contract in 2018 and has subsequently retired from acting to focus on a directing career.

McCullough has also played the character in one episode of the GH spinoff Port Charles, and in a few episodes of All My Children. In summer 2007, again as Robin, she played one of the leads in the primetime GH spinoff, General Hospital: Night Shift.

McCullough is also an ABC Director Fellow, shadowing other directors.

Career
In 1985, after failing to land a role on the TV sitcom Webster, McCullough auditioned for the role of Robin Scorpio, the 6-year-old daughter of Robert Scorpio (Tristan Rogers) and Anna Devane (director/actress Finola Hughes). The producers made her audition 12 times but eventually gave her the part and her role became a popular success.

In the fall of 1985, McCullough made her debut during the Asian Quarter storyline, which showcased her acting skills alongside veteran actor Keye Luke through the majority of the storyline. In 1989 at the age of 11, McCullough won her first Daytime Emmy Award, for "Outstanding Juvenile Female in a Drama Series". One of her most memorable storylines began in 1995, when her teenage character contracted HIV after having unprotected sex with her boyfriend Stone, who was unknowingly infected with the virus and later died of AIDS. She won a second Daytime Emmy in 1996 for this storyline, once again for "Outstanding Younger Leading Actress in a Drama Series". In 1996, she took a short break from playing the character when she went off to college for a brief stint at New York University Tisch School of the Arts from 1996 to 1997, although she never graduated or received a degree from the university. On General Hospital, Robin Scorpio was also written out for the same reason, except the character was attending Yale University to study medicine. Unlike many soap opera characters, her character of Robin Scorpio has never been "sorased" but has aged in real time along with McCullough.

In 1998, she returned to the show, but then left once again to pursue other acting opportunities, which included co-starring in the primetime drama series Once and Again and Joan of Arcadia. She also wrote and directed the mockumentary Lil Star about girls in childhood beauty pageants, a story which allowed McCullough to draw on her own experiences. In 2001 she appeared in the movie Legally Blonde as Amy, one of Elle Woods' sorority sisters.  After brief returns to General Hospital in 2000 and 2004, she returned on a permanent basis in October 2005, with her character Robin Scorpio a doctor, having graduated from medical school. In November 2011, McCullough announced her plans to leave General Hospital once again in order to pursue a career as a director, and her character was believed to have died on February 21, 2012. However, scenes airing on March 27, 2012, showed Robin to be alive and held captive in an undisclosed location, leaving the door open for her to return in the future. Starting in July 2012, McCullough made several guest appearances on General Hospital, and returned to the role in 2013.

She again went off contract in 2018, announcing her retirement from acting to focus on a directing career. McCullough did make an appearance in 2021 to participate in an on-air tribute for actor John Reilly, who played Sean Donely.

In 2011, McCullough directed the short film Nice Guys Finish Last. The film starred Danielle Harris and McCullough's General Hospital co-star Lexi Ainsworth.

Personal life

McCullough was born in Bellflower, California. She has two older brothers and is of Mexican descent.  Her mother is a dance teacher, who took her to rehearsals, and got her involved with acting. McCullough's first appearance was as a 7-month-old baby in a diaper commercial, co-starring with actress Juliet Mills. She started doing gymnastics at the age of 4, and performed as part of a group called the Gym Dandies. McCullough followed this up with a dancing part in Breakin' 2: Electric Boogaloo. McCullough was involved in a long-term relationship with Freddie Prinze Jr., before he met Sarah Michelle Gellar.

In a year-end blog post for 2015, McCullough revealed she had a miscarriage. In her 2016 Year End Wrap Up, she revealed she was pregnant again with her second child. McCullough gave birth to her son, Otis, on June 7, 2017.

Filmography

Film

Television

As a director

Awards
All of McCullough's awards and nominations have been for her role as Robin Scorpio on General Hospital.

Won
(1986) Young Artist Award, Outstanding Young Actress – Regular Daytime Serial
(1986) Soap Opera Digest Award, Outstanding Youth Actor/Actress on a Daytime or Prime Time Serial
(1986) Young Artist Award, Exceptional Performance by a Young Actress in a Daytime Series
(1989) Daytime Emmy, Outstanding Younger Actress in a Drama Series
(1993) Soap Opera Digest Awards, Outstanding Child Actor
(1996) Daytime Emmy, Outstanding Younger Actress in a Drama Series

Nominated
(1988) Young Artist Award, Best Young Actress Starring in a Television Drama Series
(1989) Young Artist Award, Best Young Actress in a Daytime Drama Series
(1989) Young Artist Award, Best Young Actress in Theater
(1990) Young Artist Award, Best Young Actress in a Daytime Drama Series
(1990) Daytime Emmy, Outstanding Younger Actress in a Drama Series
(1991) Daytime Emmy, Outstanding Younger Actress in a Drama Series
(1992) Soap Opera Digest Award, Outstanding Younger Leading Actress: Daytime
(1995) Daytime Emmy, Outstanding Younger Actress in a Drama Series
(1997) YoungStar Award, Best Performance by a Young Actress in a Daytime TV Program
(1997) Young Artist Award, Best Performance in a Daytime Drama – Young Actress
(1997) Daytime Emmy, Outstanding Younger Actress in a Drama Series

References

External links

1978 births
20th-century American actresses
21st-century American actresses
Actresses from California
American child actresses
American soap opera actresses
American television actresses
Living people
People from Bellflower, California
Daytime Emmy Award winners
Daytime Emmy Award for Outstanding Younger Actress in a Drama Series winners
American television directors
American women television directors